Tasayevo Airport is an airport in Russia located 5 km south of Tasayevo. It is a small civilian airfield, with no taxiways and a small parking tarmac.

References
RussianAirFields.com

Airports built in the Soviet Union
Airports in Krasnoyarsk Krai